The Gauchito Gil (literally "Little Gaucho Gil") is a folk religious figure of Argentina's popular culture. Allegedly born in the area of Pay Ubre, nowadays Mercedes, Corrientes, possibly in the 1840s, and died on 8 January 1878. He is regarded as the most prominent folk hero in Argentina, with smaller areas of veneration reported in Paraguay, Chile and Brazil.

Legend 
Popular accounts vary, but in broad terms, the legend tells that Antonio Gil was born in the 1840s somewhere in rural Argentina. He joined or was conscripted into the army during the Triple Alliance War but soon deserted.

After escaping military service a first time, he was forcibly recruited to fight again in the Argentine Civil War but again managed to evade service and became an outlaw. In the years following his desertion, he acquired a reputation as a Robin Hood figure.

Current veneration

Gauchito Gil is thought to be a folk saint by many people of the Argentine provinces of Formosa, Corrientes, Chaco, the north of Santa Fe and even the province of Buenos Aires. One can spot smaller shrines of Gauchito Gil on roadsides throughout Argentina due to the red color and the flags, many of which read "Thanks, Gauchito Gil" if the person's request is fulfilled. The Sanctuary of Gauchito Gil (located about 8 km from the city of Mercedes) organizes great pilgrimages, to which more than 200,000 pilgrims annually head to the sanctuary to ask the saint for favors. The Sanctuary has a mausoleum which holds the actual tomb of Gauchito Gil; plaques adorn the walls and state the names of those whose requests were granted by the saint.

Moreover, each January 8 (date of Gil's death and his feast day), there is a large celebration honoring Gauchito Gil. Many pilgrims arrive and participate in festive activities, such as drinking, dancing, folklorical animal sports, and a procession that begins from the church in Mercedes to the Sanctuary. Paraphernalia related to the saint, including ribbons, rosaries, flags and statues, are often carried by the pilgrims and sold by vendors. Gauchito Gil statues are commonly seen next to images of San La Muerte, Our Lady of Luján and other Catholic figures.

Gauchito Gil is not recognized as a saint by the Catholic Church, though many Argentines, both devotees and church leaders, have been promoting him for canonization. Local church leaders in Mercedes hold masses on his feast day in the Church of Our Lady of Mercy. Other church leaders in Argentina have participated and approved of the devotion of Gauchito Gil, while some are divided on whether to embrace or condemn the phenomenon. The Diocese of Goya and the Mexican Diocese of Celaya have both recognized the veneration of Gauchito Gil.

See also
 María Lionza
 José Gregorio Hernández
 Jesús Malverde

References

External links
"The Legend of Argentina's Gaucho Gil", NPR, byline Oct 10, 2004, accessed Nov. 14, 2007
"Cultures of Devotion by Frank Graziano", academic website with images relating to Gaucho Gil and other Spanish American folk saints.
Gauchito (Curuzú) Gil at Folklore del Norte.
El Gauchito Gil at La Guía del Chaco.
'Reportage about Gauchito Gil'
Dos gauchos que atraen la veneración popular.

19th-century births
1878 deaths
People from Mercedes, Corrientes
Argentine saints
Argentine folklore
Christian folklore
Catholicism in Argentina
Folk saints
Miracle workers
Argentine legends
Folk Catholicism